Baburao Paranjpe (बाबूराव परांजपे, 1922–1999) was an Indian politician. Shri Paranjape was a leader of Bharatiya Janata Party and a member of Lok Sabha from Jabalpur in Madhya Pradesh. He was a member of Seventh Lok Sabha (1982–84) after winning bye-election in 1982, Ninth (1989–91), Eleventh (1996–98) and Twelfth (1998–1999) Lok Sabha. He was the defeated BJP candidate from Jabalpur in 1984 and 1991 elections, when there was pro-Congress sympathy wave after the assassinations of Indira Gandhi and Rajiv Gandhi respectively.

He was Mayor of Jabalpur from 1957 to 1975. Paranjpe joined Azad Hind Fauj and saw action during the Second World War in 1944. He died on 27 September 1999.

References

Bharatiya Janata Party politicians from Madhya Pradesh
People from Jabalpur
India MPs 1980–1984
1922 births
1999 deaths
Indian National Army personnel
India MPs 1989–1991
India MPs 1998–1999
India MPs 1996–1997
Lok Sabha members from Madhya Pradesh
Mayors of places in Madhya Pradesh